Nagaram is a village and panchayat in Ranga Reddy district, AP, India. It falls under the Maheswaram mandal. It is about 7 km from Shamshabad International Airport. It takes approximately 5 minutes on the ORR to reach Nagaram exit point from the Airport. It has the advantage of close proximity to the Airport, as well as Nagaram Village and Maheshwaram Mandal (ITIR region). A few connecting roads to Manasapally 'X' roads and Nagaram village are coming up fast and will pave the way for further growth.

References

Villages in Ranga Reddy district